Zakrzewko may refer to the following places:
Zakrzewko, Nowy Tomyśl County in Greater Poland Voivodeship (west-central Poland)
Zakrzewko, Kuyavian-Pomeranian Voivodeship (north-central Poland)
Zakrzewko, Masovian Voivodeship (east-central Poland)
Zakrzewko, Szamotuły County in Greater Poland Voivodeship (west-central Poland)
Zakrzewko, Warmian-Masurian Voivodeship (north Poland)